Echinopsis ferox,  is a species of Echinopsis found in Bolivia and Argentina.

References

External links
 
 

ferox